Willian Simões.(born March 6, 1988 in Cachoeiro de Itapemirim) is a Brazilian footballer who plays as left back.

Career statistics

References

External links

1988 births
Living people
Brazilian footballers
Association football defenders
Fortaleza Esporte Clube players
Paysandu Sport Club players
Clube Náutico Capibaribe players